The Ducati Panigale V2 is a 955 cc (58.3 cu in) V-twin engine sport bike manufactured by Ducati as the successor to the Panigale 959. The motorcycle is named after the  manufacturing district of Borgo Panigale. It was announced in 2019 for the 2020 model year. Chassis is a very similar monocoque with stressed-member engine; the engine bore and stroke remained the same; some re-engineering resulted in a  increase and Euro 5 emissions compliance.

References

Ducati motorcycles
Motorcycles introduced in 2020